News Digest is a Nigerian newspaper publishing company, based in Abuja that publishes daily news in English-language.

History
The News Digest was established on March 28, 2018. The Abuja-based news media outfit became popular after the arrest of the webmaster of the news site, Mr. Adebowale Adekoya by Nigerian Police Force from Kwara over a news report by Alfred Olufemi about one of the companies of a former Central Bank of Nigeria's Deputy Governor, who is currently an aid to president Muhammadu Buhari, Dr. Sarah Alade called Hillcrest Agro-Allied Industry in Kwara State Nigeria. The controversial article is titled: "Inside Kwara Factory where Indian Hemp Smoking is ‘Legalized’." The webmaster was later released after five days of unlawful detention. The publisher, and the journalist that carried out the investigation were charged to court.

Personnel
Gidado Yushau Shuaib, a social commentator is the Publisher and Editor-in-Chief of News Digest. He is an alumnus of Bayero University in Kano, Baze University in Abuja,  University of Westminster, in England. Other staff includes but not limited to Segun Adeyemi - Managing Editor,
Ezekiel Kayode (Deputy Editor/Head of planning and strategy), Oluwatosin Ologun (Assistant Editor News), Damilola Olufemi (Assistant Editor Investigations)
Reginald Tobin (Associate Editor South-South Bureau), Samuel Ogunsolu (Associate Editor/Copy Writer), Chinedu Sahara (Senior Staff Reporter Opinion), Abdullahi Abdullateef (Senior Staff Reporter Health).

References

External links
 Official Website

Publications established in 2018
Daily newspapers published in Nigeria
Newspapers published in Abuja